Lecanora strobilina, also known as the mealy rim lichen, is a species of crustose lichen in the family Lecanoraceae. It was originally described as Parmelia strobilina by German botanist Kurt Polycarp Joachim Sprengel in 1827. It is distributed across North America and the Mediterranean but has become established in South America and the Galapagos.  It can be distinguished from other closely-related species in the genus (including L. confusa) by the presence of the polyphenolic compound decarboxysquamatic acid in thin-layer chromatography (TLC).

See also 
List of Lecanora species

References

strobilina
Lichen species
Lichens described in 1827
Lichens of North America
Taxa named by Kurt Polycarp Joachim Sprengel